Illich Auyapah Guardiola (born July 5, 1972) is a Honduran former voice actor who provided voice roles for Japanese anime. He previously worked for ADV Films, Funimation, and Seraphim Digital, and as a stage actor and director in the Houston theatre community. Some of his major anime roles include Gin in One Piece, Kanba Takakura in Mawaru Penguindrum, Arawn in Tears to Tiara, Nimi in From the New World, Suguru Omi in the Hiro no Kakera series, and Yusuke Yoshino from the Clannad series.

Personal life and legal issues
In April 2014, Guardiola was pulled over by Spring Branch Police and was found to have one of his 16-year-old students with him, who told investigators they were in a sexual relationship. Later that month, Guardiola and the teen traveled to Las Vegas and were married in the presence of the teen's mother. Guardiola was subsequently arrested on May 8, 2014, and charged with sexual assault of a child.  On September 5, 2014, the charges were dismissed, since both the teen in question and her parents insisted that the relationship was consensual, refusing to press charges or to cooperate with police investigators.

Guardiola was in a previous relationship with Monica Rial in the 1990s.

Filmography

Anime

References

External links
 
 

1972 births
Living people
American male stage actors
American male voice actors
Honduran emigrants to the United States